Roman Kasprzyk (born 4 September 1942) is a Polish footballer. He played in two matches for the Poland national football team in 1963.

References

External links
 

1942 births
Living people
Polish footballers
Poland international footballers
Place of birth missing (living people)
Association footballers not categorized by position